A referendum on restoring multi-party democracy was held in Uganda on 29 June 2000. Voters were asked "Which political system do you wish to adopt, Movement or Multiparty?" The result was 90.7% in support of the non-partisan Movement system with a voter turnout of 51.1%

A second referendum on the subject was held in 2005, with the reverse result.

Results

References

2000 in Uganda
Referendums in Uganda
2000 referendums